Dorothy "Dottie" O'Neil (born 1930 in Norwich, Connecticut) is a retired American badminton player.

Playing History 
O'Neil won women's singles titles at numerous tournaments including the Mason-Dixon, Mid-Atlantic, New England, and Connecticut Opens from the late 1950s through the late 1960s. She won the US Open women's singles title in 1964 after having reached the finals of the event several times previously. She was ranked second in the United States six times behind the world's dominant women's player of the era Judy Devlin Hashman, and was repeatedly ranked in the top three nationally in women's doubles. She co-ranked first with partner Rosine Lemon in 1972.

In international events, O'Neil won the Mexican Open Singles in 1965 and competed for the United States in the World Team Championships for Women, also known as the Uber Cup, including the World Champion US teams of 1960 and 1963. She also played on the 1969 Uber Cup team and was captain of the team in 1972.

In 1994 O'Neil was inducted into the USA Badminton Hall of Fame.

References 

American female badminton players
1930 births
Living people
21st-century American women